Of the 9 Massachusetts incumbents, 6 were re-elected.

See also 
 List of United States representatives from Massachusetts
 United States House of Representatives elections, 1972

1972
Massachusetts
1972 Massachusetts elections